Dracula is a television adaptation of Bram Stoker's 1897 novel, Dracula, produced by Granada Television for WGBH Boston and BBC Wales in 2006. It was written by Stewart Harcourt and directed by Bill Eagles.

Plot
In 1899, Arthur Holmwood is diagnosed with syphilis soon after becoming engaged to Lucy Westenra. Knowing that the disease would kill both him and his fiancée, he contacts an occult group called the Brotherhood, which is being led by a man named Singleton. Singleton claims that they know someone who can cure him of the disease, but for a price.

Lucy's best friend is Mina Murray, who is engaged to Jonathan Harker, a solicitor. Arthur hires his firm to sell several properties to a Count Dracula in Transylvania. Soon after his departure, his employer is murdered, and all documents about the transaction go missing. Singleton calmly confesses the deed, telling Arthur the "young man" will never return from Transylvania.

In Transylvania, Jonathan meets Count Dracula, a nine hundred-year-old vampire. Dracula murders Harker, assumes a youthful appearance after drinking his blood, and is soon en route to England aboard the Demeter. The Demeter eventually reaches Whitby but struggles to dock during a storm. The beached ship is revealed to be empty the next morning, save for the deceased captain and some empty crates.

Mina senses that something has happened to Jonathan, and Lucy invites her to stay with Lucy and Arthur in Whitby. Mina's worries are confirmed when she discovers that Jonathan was supposed to have been aboard the ship.

Arthur is becoming cold and distant, and Lucy expresses anxiety over their marriage not yet being consummated. Later on, she encounters Count Dracula, who consoles her. He introduces himself to Lucy, who invites him for dinner. Arthur, enraged to find Dracula in his home, finds himself powerless as Lucy suddenly falls victim to the vampire. Arthur's old friend, Dr. Seward, is suspicious when Arthur refuses to take Lucy to the hospital. He then forces Seward at gunpoint to give her a blood transfusion from his own arm. However, Lucy dies the next morning, and Seward is convinced that Arthur is responsible for her sudden death.

He investigates and finds the Chelsea home of the Brotherhood, where Singleton and others have been murdered. In the basement, surrounded by crosses made of twigs, he finds Professor Abraham Van Helsing, living like an animal, who insists they must free him at once. Van Helsing explains that he was employed as a folklorist by the Brotherhood to investigate vampires. He eventually found Dracula and was released with a message to the Brotherhood: he would come to them if invited, but only if provided with property. Frightened by Van Helsing's ordeal with Dracula, they sent Jonathan instead and imprisoned Van Helsing. Seward attempts to explain this to Mina, but she is skeptical. Seward confronts a grief-stricken and remorseful Arthur, who explains that his syphilis prevented him from consummating his marriage. He arranged for Dracula to come to England, hoping that he would cure him of the disease.

The three go after a now undead Lucy while Dracula pursues Mina, who soon realises Seward was telling the truth when Dracula attempts to bite her. However, Arthur is forced to destroy his wife when she attempts to bite him and Seward. Dracula senses this, allowing Mina to escape. Seward, Arthur, and Van Helsing meet her at her home, where they agree to go after Dracula, just before dawn, where he will be at his weakest. They arrive at Dracula's crypt, where Dracula appears and attacks Mina. Arthur sacrifices himself to Dracula to buy Mina an escape. Van Helsing distracts Dracula with a cross, giving Seward the chance to stake him from behind.

Mina has moved on and starts a new life with Seward sometime later. After Mina and Seward bid farewell to Van Helsing, who is leaving for Holland, a decrepit Dracula appears and watches the couple as they walk down the street, apparently having survived Seward's attack.

Cast
 Marc Warren as Count Dracula
 Dan Stevens as Lord Holmwood
 Stephanie Leonidas as Mina Murray
 Tom Burke as Dr. John Seward
 Sophia Myles as Lady Holmwood/Lucy Westenra
 David Suchet as Abraham Van Helsing
 Rafe Spall as Jonathan Harker
 Donald Sumpter as Mr. Simpkins

Reception
Critical reaction to the film was mixed. MaryAnn Johanson of FlickFilosopher.com called the film "fresh and erudite" and "a valuable new angle on an old story." The SF, Horror and Fantasy Film Review wrote that "the film does finally gain some sizzle when it comes to the scenes of Marc Warren’s Dracula seducing Sophia Myles’s Lucy but added that "Warren occasionally creates a dark magnetism, but mostly looks too cute and boyish to fill a role as big as Dracula." Felix Vasquez Jr. of Cinema Crazed said, "Your best bet for your fanged fix would be to sit down and watch Bram Stoker’s Dracula, instead, and for the hell of it, Horror of Dracula, and Universal’s Dracula, because they’re worthy variations. This isn't. ... It's not awful, but it's still rather anemic."

Release
Prior to release trailers were released featuring David Bowie's song Warszawa. It was first aired on 28 December 2006 in the United Kingdom. It premiered in the USA on PBS as part of the WGBH series Masterpiece on 11 February 2007. It premiered in Ireland on 27 December 2021 on Virgin Media Three.

Background
One member of the cast, Sophia Myles, had previously portrayed a vampire in (Underworld). Marc Warren had previously worked with David Suchet in the film Five Little Pigs for Poirot, while Donald Sumpter had appeared in The A.B.C. Murders.

See also
Bram Stoker's Dracula's Curse - Another Dracula film released in 2006, produced by The Asylum
Vampire film

References

External links
Official BBC microsite
Official BBC Press Release
Information from a Sophia Myles fansite
Article on the Adaptation
Listing for the DVD
BBC Promotion
Second BBC Promotion
 
 

Dracula films
Dracula television shows
Films set in 1899
Films based on horror novels
British television films
2006 television films
2006 films
British horror films
Horror television films
Films directed by Bill Eagles
2000s English-language films
Films set in London
Films set in Transylvania
Films set in Whitby
2000s British films